MarieChantal Chassé is a Canadian politician, who was elected to the National Assembly of Quebec in the 2018 provincial election. She represents the electoral district of Châteauguay as a member of the Coalition Avenir Québec.

Cabinet posts
 
François Legault dropped environment minister MarieChantal Chassé from his cabinet less than three months after her appointment.  Her replacement was Benoit Charette, member of the National Assembly for Deux-Montagnes.  It was the first cabinet shuffle since the Legault cabinet was sworn in on October 18.

References

Living people
Coalition Avenir Québec MNAs
21st-century Canadian politicians
Members of the Executive Council of Quebec
Women government ministers of Canada
Women MNAs in Quebec
People from Montérégie
Year of birth missing (living people)
21st-century Canadian women politicians